The Sunbeam Silver Bullet was the last attempt at the land speed record by Sunbeam of Wolverhampton. It was built in 1929 for Kaye Don. Powered by two supercharged engines of 24 litres each, it looked impressive but failed to achieve any records.

Sunbeam's 1927 200 mph land speed record won with the Sunbeam 1000HP had been broken by 1929, and the company decided to build a car capable of reaching  so as to recover it. Only aero engines offered enough power to do this, and such a car would also provide a test bed for developing a new generation of Sunbeam aero-engines.

Sunbeam 2,000 hp engine 

This new engine was a water-cooled V-12 with a 50° angle between the banks. Ideal balance usually favours an angle of 60°, but this choice made the engine narrower overall. This oversquare geometry was a first for Sunbeam, but encouraged a high-revving and thus more powerful engine.

The engines were supercharged, using a large centrifugal blower, geared to 17,000 rpm. This was increasingly common aero engine practice of the time, in both the Napier Lion and the Rolls-Royce R-type, but again was a first for Sunbeam.

When installed in the record-attempt car the engines had an unusual cooling system using melting ice rather than a radiator. This avoided the drag of an open radiator, but obviously could only cool for as long as the ice lasted. It was a workable system for land speed records, used by the contemporary Golden Arrow and more recently by the JCB Dieselmax. Silver Bullet had an  ice tank, filled with 5.5 hundredweight (about 280 kilograms) of ice before each run, and a one-gallon mixing tank in the nose.

Photographs & Video 

Photographs of the car are rare, although there are some at the Brooklands photo archive. These show it outside Delaney & Sons. garage, a popular location for racing in this era.  Some also show close-ups, including the innovative rear aerofoil that could be adjusted to generate downforce.

Rare Movietone News footage on YouTube shows the car outside the Sunbeam factory in Wolverhampton, England with a crowd of Sunbeam workers. Kaye Don arrives driving the Sunbeam V12 racing and land speed record car "Sunbeam Tiger". He is met by Louis Coatalen, Sunbeam's Managing Director and Chief Engineer who describes the effort to make the car. Don describes the planned attempt on the Land Speed Record at Daytona Beach on Florida

Specifications

Unsuccessful record attempts 
Competition for the land speed record between Segrave's Golden Arrow and Malcolm Campbell's new Blue Bird was fierce, so the car was built quickly, working around the clock in shifts. This left little time for thorough static testing of the engines, made even worse as only two engines were ever built and so the only engines available for testing were the race engines themselves. Silver Bullet first appeared in public on 21 February 1930.

Following the other teams, the first record attempt was to be made on Daytona Beach, in Florida, with Kaye Don driving. The car arrived at Daytona on 8 March and Louis Coatalen himself on 16th. The record attempts went poorly though, with engine reliability problems and the car proving difficult to control.

After the team returned home, further attempts were made to improve the car with testing on Pendine Sands.

Sunbeam aircraft engines had never recovered from the financial effects of the end of the Great War. Coupled with the Depression of the 1930s, Sunbeam simply could not afford a competition program of this scale. Although other UK car companies even did well in this period, Sunbeam did not and went into receivership in 1935.

The Silver Bullet was sold to Jack Field, a Southport hotelier and garage owner. He tested the car on Southport beach, scene of Segrave's earlier success with the Sunbeam Tiger, but couldn't solve its problems and eventually the car was scrapped.

Tribute to the 'Silver Bullet' in Public Art 

In 1996 a redevelopment of the former works site of Star cars, in St. John's, Wolverhampton into a new Retail Park saw a themed set of public art features referencing the Sunbeam Land speed record attempts. A bronze relief panel tribute to the Silver Bullet car was depicted in a bas relief, attempting the speed record with reference to Kaye Don as the driver. The whole series of artworks around the Retail site were a design collaboration of artist Steve Field and the sculptor John McKenna A.R.B.S and rendered in 1930's Art Deco manner. They showed other Sunbeam Record attempts and reference the historical industrial car making heritage of Wolverhampton.

References

External links
 "Speeding Back To Yesterday", January 1931, Popular Mechanics
 

Sunbeam vehicles
Wheel-driven land speed record cars
Sunbeam aircraft engines